Ludo Campbell-Reid is Design Champion and General Manager of the Auckland Design Office at Auckland Council. He is an urban designer and planning specialist, and a competitive rower. Campbell-Reid was born to an English father and a South African mother in Hampton Court, southwest London, in 1968.  He graduated from the University of Westminster in London with a BA with Honours In Urban Planning Studies, then completed a MA and Diploma In Urban Design at Oxford Brookes University.

Campbell-Reid's achievements in urban design began in South Africa from 1992 to 1997, where he worked on the country's first ski resort, assisted in transforming the Victoria and Alfred basins into Cape Town's world-class Victoria & Alfred Waterfront, and worked on that city's bid to host the 2004 Olympic Games.  In 1997 he returned to London where he worked for Tibbalds Planning & Urban Design before becoming senior urban designer at Tower Hamlets Borough in east London.  He worked on the transformation of London's Canary Wharf, and in 2003 was shortlisted for the London Planning Awards in the category of best public sector planner.

Ludo was appointed Auckland City Council's first ever Design Champion in 2006 following recommendations of The Mayoral Task Force on Urban Design. Ludo and his team at Auckland Council delivered the first City Centre Masterplan in 2012. This plan set in motion the people-centered urban renaissance of the downtown area and seven years on, they are now out consulting with Aucklanders on its refresh. They have been instrumental in creating shared spaces throughout the city, they have played a key role in the redevelopment of Wynyard Quarter and Britomart, and they have made their mark on globally award-winning projects like Lightpath - Te Ara I Whiti.

References 

New Zealand urban planners
Urban designers
Living people
Alumni of Oxford Brookes University
Year of birth missing (living people)